La Comté is a commune in the Pas-de-Calais department in the Hauts-de-France region of France.

Geography

Population

Places of interest
The church of St.Martin, dating from the sixteenth century.
An eighteenth-century farmhouse, at a site known as the old castle.

See also
Communes of the Pas-de-Calais department

References

Comte